Juan Eduardo Fuentes Jiménez (born 21 March 1995) is a Chilean footballer that currently plays for the Primera Division club Universidad Católica on loan from O'Higgins as midfielder. He is twin brother of the footballer Luis Fuentes.

Career

Youth career
Fuentes started his career in 2009 at Primera División de Chile club O'Higgins. He progressed from the under categories club all the way to the senior team.

O'Higgins
Fuentes won the Apertura 2013-14 with O'Higgins, in the 2013–14 Súper Final Apertura against Universidad Católica, being the first title for O'Higgins.

In 2014, he won the Supercopa de Chile against Deportes Iquique, in the match that O'Higgins won at the penalty shoot-out.

He participated with the club in the 2014 Copa Libertadores where they faced Deportivo Cali, Cerro Porteño and Lanús, being third and being eliminated in the group stage.

Universidad Católica
In 2020, he signs for the chilean club Universidad Católica on loan for a year with a buy option clause.

International career
He was part of the Chile national under-20 football team, who played the 2015 South American Youth Championship in Uruguay.

Honours

Club
O'Higgins
 Primera División de Chile (1): 2013 Apertura
 Supercopa de Chile (1): 2014

Universidad Católica
Primera División de Chile (2): 2020, 2021
 Supercopa de Chile (2):  2020, 2021

Individual
O'Higgins
Medalla Santa Cruz de Triana: 2014

References

External links
 Fuentes at Football Lineups
 

1995 births
Living people
Chilean footballers
Chilean expatriate footballers
O'Higgins F.C. footballers
Estudiantes de La Plata footballers
Chilean Primera División players
Argentine Primera División players
2015 South American Youth Football Championship players
Association football midfielders
Chilean expatriate sportspeople in Argentina
Expatriate footballers in Argentina
People from Rancagua